n Saak van Geloof is a South African Afrikaans-language drama film directed by Diony Kempen and released on 9 September 2011.

Main cast
 Robbie Wessels
 Lelia Etsebeth
 Sophia Wessels
 Vanessa Lee
 Niekie van den Berg 
 Riana Nel
 Michael Brunner

References

External links

South African drama films